Laxminiya Bazzar is a village (gaunpalika), one of eight rural municipalities located in the Laxminiya Bazzar Morang District of Province No. 1 of Nepal. There are a total of 17 municipalities in Morang of which nine are urban and eight are rural.

Bhathigach, Majhare, Sisawanijahada, Pokhariya and Budhanagar which previously were all separate village development committees that merged to form this new local level body. Fulfilling the requirements of the new Constitution of Nepal 2015, Ministry of Federal Affairs and Local Development replaced all old VDCs and Municipalities into 753 new local level body (Municipality).

This rural municipality is divided into a total seven wards and the headquarters of this newly formed rural municipality is situated in Majhare.

References

Populated places in Morang District